Vladimir Pavlovich Ovchinnikov (born January 2, 1958) is a Russian pianist from Belebey, Bashkir ASSR. He is the only pianist ever to win the top prizes at both the International Tchaikovsky Competition in Moscow (1982, first prize not awarded, received a joint 2nd prize with Peter Donohoe) and the Leeds International Pianoforte Competition (1987). Artistic Director of the Association of Tchaikovsky Competition Stars since 2000.

Career 
A graduate of the Moscow Conservatory where he studied with Aleksey Nasedkin, Vladimir Ovchinnikov is resident professor of piano at the Moscow Conservatory and guest professor of piano at Sakuyo University in Japan. He was awarded second place in the Montreal International Music Competition in 1980. In 1982, he was awarded joint second prize with Peter Donohoe in the International Tchaikovsky Competition (no first prize was awarded that year). In 1987, he was awarded first prize at the Leeds International Pianoforte Competition. In 2005, he received Russia's highest award and honor for musicians - the title "People's Artist of Russia", awarded by the Russian president.

Served as a chairman and a member of the jury at the International Tchaikovsky Competition, the International Tchaikovsky Competition for Young Musicians, the International Russian Rotary Children Music Competition and many others. Was appointed as a headmaster of the Central Music School of the Moscow Conservatory in 2011.

Ovchinnikov appears regularly with such leading Russian orchestras as the Moscow Philharmonic; Moscow Radio Symphony and the St Petersburg Philharmonic; he also has a long-standing relationship with the Russian State Symphony Orchestra, and was a special favorite of Yevgeny Svetlanov, with whom he toured France, the Netherlands, North and South America.

Concerto appearances in Europe and North America have included the following: 

Ovchinnikov has played under various conductors including:

Among his recordings are Shostakovich's Piano Concerto No. 1 coupled with Mussorgsky's Pictures at an Exhibition (Collins Classics), Rachmaninoff's Études-Tableaux, and Liszt's Transcendental Études, and Prokofiev's Piano Sonatas (EMI). Other recordings include sonatas for violin and piano by Grieg (together with the violinist Vinnitsky) - for the Russian Seasons label, also - Liszt, Tchaikovsky, Taneyev, Rubinstein for Gold Club

External links 
 Ovchinnikov's American Management Schmidt Artists International
 Leeds International Pianoforte Competition

1958 births
Living people
People from Belebey
Russian classical pianists
Male classical pianists
Prize-winners of the Leeds International Pianoforte Competition
Prize-winners of the International Tchaikovsky Competition
Moscow Conservatory alumni
Academic staff of Moscow Conservatory